Garre may refer to:

Garre, a Somali pastoralist clan that live in Somalia, Kenya, and Ethiopia
Nilda Garré (born 1945), a former leftist militant and the current defense minister of Argentina
Oscar Garré (born 1956), a former Argentine football defender
Carl Garré (1857–1928), Swiss surgeon who discovered staphylococcus, Garrés disease and Garrés osteomyelitis

See also
Garr
Gar (disambiguation)